Hospital is a Peruvian football club, playing in the city of Pucallpa, Ucayali.

The club were founded 1971 and play in the Copa Perú which is the third division of the Peruvian league.

History
The club have played at the highest level of Peruvian football on three occasions, from 1989 Torneo Descentralizado until 1991 Torneo Descentralizado when was relegated.

In the 2010 Copa Perú, the club classified to the National Stage, but was eliminated by Unión Comercio in the semifinals.

Notable players

Honours

Regional
Región III: 0
Runner-up (3): 2006, 2007, 2010

Liga Departamental de Ucayali: 1
Winners (1): 2010
Runner-up (3): 2005, 2006, 2007

See also
List of football clubs in Peru
Peruvian football league system

References

 

Football clubs in Peru
Association football clubs established in 1971
1971 establishments in Peru
Works association football teams